Tim Bourke (born 14 April 1969) is a former Australian rules footballer who played with Geelong in the Victorian/Australian Football League (VFL/AFL).

A ruckman from St Joseph's, Bourke played five senior games for Geelong. He debuted in the opening round of the 1989 VFL season, a two-point loss to North Melbourne Football Club at the Melbourne Cricket Ground. His other four games came early in 1990, rounds two to five.

His older brother, Damian Bourke, missed the opening round of the 1989 season and didn't play at all in 1990 due to a knee injury, so the pair never got to play together.

At the end of the 1991 season, Bourke was traded to North Melbourne, for a late draft pick. He was cut from North Melbourne's list in March 1992.

References

1969 births
Australian rules footballers from Victoria (Australia)
Geelong Football Club players
St Joseph's Football Club players
Living people